Emily Song may refer to:

 Emily Ge Song, Chinese-American media executive
 Song Mi-jin (born 1979), South Korean singer